Joe Simon (1913–2011) was a comic book writer who co-created Captain America.

Joe Simon may also refer to:

 Joe Simon (musician) (1936–2021), R&B musician
 Joe Simon, wrestler known as Joe Malenko
 Joe Simon (film director), Kannada film director, writer, actor and lyricist
 J. Minos Simon (1922–2004), American author, lecturer, aviator, and attorney

See also
 Joseph Simon (disambiguation)